Katabon Mosque in Shahbag, Dhaka is a center for Muslim missionaries in Bangladesh.  It houses the Bangladesh Masjid Mission (Bangladesh Mosque Mission) and is officially named as the "Bangladesh Masjid Mission Complex Central Mosque". It is founded at the stables of Dhaka Nawab Family.

The mosque houses the Islamic Economics Research Bureau, which works to "synergize the intellectual capabilities of the modern day professionals, academicians, and students of Islamic banking and finance". Many of these organizations advocate for a more orthodox form of Islam in Bangladesh.

See also
 List of mosques in Bangladesh

References

External links
 Katabon Mosque at WikiMapia
 Bangladesh Masjid Mission Official Website

Mosques in Dhaka